Farley Wood is a suburb in the civil parish of Binfield, approximately  west of Bracknell, in the English county of Berkshire. Farley Wood is dominated by Farley Copse (sometimes known as Farley Moor Copse), a large woodland and local nature reserve on the slopes falling away from Farley Hall and Farley Moor, two large Victorian houses.

Following the building in the 1980s of a small housing estate either side of the Turnpike Road, the remaining copse was adopted by Bracknell Forest Borough Council providing a large woodland space full of oak, beech and ash trees; it is also home to a large Wellingtonia pine as well as various Roe Deer. Farley Wood Community Centre is nearby .

To the south of the wood is Farley Moor Lake in the vicinity of which are many of Bracknell's big employers, such as Cable & Wireless, 3M, Fujitsu, HP and Dell in the nearby Amen Corner Business Park.

References

Bracknell Forest
Suburbs in the United Kingdom